was a Japanese entrepreneur. He was the son-in-law of Toyota Industries Co., Ltd founder Sakichi Toyoda, and brother-in-law of Toyota Motor Corporation founder,  His original surname was Kodama (児玉). 

He graduated from Hitotsubashi University (then Tokyo Koto Shogyo Gakko) .In 1939, he became the first president of the Toyota Motor Corporation. He died at the age of 68 in 1952.

See also 
 Kiichiro Toyoda
 Sakichi Toyoda
 Shoichiro Toyoda

References 

 Shirouzu, Norihiko. "Toyota Family Member Vies for the Top Job," Wall Street Journal. December 24, 2008.
 International Directory of Business Biographies: Shoichiro Toyoda
 Shirouzu, Norihiko and John Murphy. "Toyota to Change Leader Amid Global Sales Slump." Wall Street Journal. December 24, 2008.
 Kubo, Nobuhiro and Chang-Ran Kim. "Toyota confirms Akio Toyoda as New President," Reuters. June 23, 2009.

1884 births
1952 deaths
20th-century Japanese businesspeople
Rizaburo
Toyota people
Hitotsubashi University alumni
Mukoyōshi